Acta Zoologica is a peer-reviewed scientific journal published by Wiley-Blackwell on behalf of the Royal Swedish Academy of Sciences and the Royal Danish Academy of Sciences and Letters. It was established in 1920 as Acta Zoologica and obtained its current name in 2002. It is one of the world's leading zoological journals and focuses on animal development, structure, and function, including physiological organization. It primarily publishes original research papers, but occasionally also publishes review articles.

Increasingly, it has concentrated on animal development, with emphasis on the functional, comparative, and phylogenetic aspects. The editor-in-chief is Lennart Olsson (University of Jena).

Abstracting and indexing 
The journal is abstracted and indexed in:

According to the Journal Citation Reports, the journal has a 2020 impact factor of 1.261, ranking it 15th out of 21 journals in the category "Anatomy & Morphology" and 105th out of 174 journals in the category "Zoology"

See also 
 List of zoology journals

References

External links 
 

Zoology journals
English-language journals
Publications established in 1920
Wiley-Blackwell academic journals
Quarterly journals
Royal Swedish Academy of Sciences
1920 establishments in Sweden